Teresa de Robles (?-1726) was Spanish stage actor, singer and theater director.

She was born to the actors Juan Luis de Robles and Ana de Escamilla (niece of Antonio de Escamilla), sister of Juan and Bartolomé de Robles and married actor   Rosendo López Estrada in 1679.

She was engaged at the royal theatres in Madrid, Teatro de la Cruz oand Teatro del Príncipe, between 1679 and 1708. She served as director of the theatre in 1700–1701. She often performed for the royal court.

References

 Gómez García, Manuel (1998). Diccionario Akal de Teatro. Ediciones Akal. ISBN 9788446008279.
 https://dbe.rah.es/biografias/83943/teresa-de-robles

17th-century births
1726 deaths
17th-century Spanish actresses
18th-century Spanish actresses
18th-century theatre managers